Middleton Road Bridge Halt was one mile northwest of the village of Middleton, Lancashire, England, open from 1904 to 1905 on the North Western Line of the Midland Railway.

History 
The station opened on 11 July 1904 by the Midland Railway. It closed in June 1905.

References

External links 

Disused railway stations in Lancaster
Former Midland Railway stations
Railway stations in Great Britain opened in 1904
Railway stations in Great Britain closed in 1905
1904 establishments in England
1905 disestablishments in England